Ferozguda is a neighbourhood of Hyderabad. It is located in Medchal district of the Indian state of Telangana. It is under the administration of Balanagar mandal of Malkajgiri revenue division.

History

During Nizam's rule, areas were named based on Hindus and Muslims community names. One of them was Ferozguda.

Transport 
Ferozguda is a part of the MMTS Phase-II under construction.

References

Neighbourhoods in Hyderabad, India